The Spain national under-18 football team represents Spain in international football at this age level and is controlled by Royal Spanish Football Federation, the governing body for football in Spain.

Competitive record

FIFA Youth Tournament Under-18 record

UEFA Youth Tournament Under-18 record

UEFA European Under-18 Championship record

UEFA–CAF Meridian Cup record

Mediterranean Games

Denotes draws include knockout matches decided on penalty kicks.
Gold background color indicates first-place finish. Silver background color indicates second-place finish. Bronze background color indicates third-place finish.
Red border color indicates tournament was held on home soil.

Current squad
 The following players were called up for the Football at the 2022 Mediterranean Games.
 Match dates: 26 June – 3 July 2022
 Caps and goals correct as of: 28 April 2022, after the match against 

Player records

 Top appearances Note: Club(s) represents the permanent clubs during the player's time in the Under-18s.

 Top goalscorers Note:' Club(s)'' represents the permanent clubs during the player's time in the Under-18s.

See also
Spain national football team
Spain national under-23 football team
Spain national under-21 football team
Spain national under-20 football team
Spain national under-19 football team
Spain national under-17 football team
Spain national under-16 football team
Spain national under-15 football team
Spain national youth football team

References

External links
siemprecantera 
Tournament archive at uefa.com
UEFA U-18 European Championship at rsssf

European national under-18 association football teams
Football